Proprioseiopsis acapius is a species of mite in the family Phytoseiidae.

References

acapius
Articles created by Qbugbot
Animals described in 1976